Betanzos is a town located in the Potosí Department of Bolivia. It is the capital of the Betanzos Canton, Betanzos Municipality and Cornelio Saavedra Province.

References 

Populated places in Potosí Department